Peter Edward Gillquist was an American archpriest in the Antiochian Orthodox Christian Archdiocese of North America and retired chairman of the archdiocese's department of missions and evangelism. He was chairman of Conciliar Press (Ben Lomond, California) and the author of numerous books, including Love Is Now, The Physical Side of Being Spiritual and Becoming Orthodox.

Upbringing and education 
Born in Minneapolis, Minnesota, Gillquist grew up nominally Lutheran. He attended the University of Minnesota where he received a BA degree in journalism and was active in the Sigma Alpha Epsilon fraternity. While at university, he became involved with the Campus Crusade for Christ evangelistic organization and became a born-again Christian.

Gillquist pursued graduate studies at Dallas Theological Seminary and at Wheaton College. After graduating, he became a full-time staff member of Campus Crusade for Christ in the 1960s, starting a ministry at the University of Notre Dame and ultimately becoming a regional director with the organization. After several years with Campus Crusade, Gillquist worked for three years at the University of Memphis, then for 11 years with Thomas Nelson Publishing in Nashville, where he eventually became a senior editor. In , he served on the Overview Committee for Nelson's New King James Version of the Bible.

For many years, alongside Episcopal priest Fr. Robert Hedges, Gillquist served as the official co-chaplain of the Sigma Alpha Epsilon fraternity, providing spiritual guidance and pastoral care to its membership.

Gillquist was the father of six children and grandfather of 19 grandchildren.

Spiritual journey 

While still on staff at Campus Crusade, Gillquist and some of his colleagues began studying church history and came to the conclusion that the Orthodox Church was the only unchanged church in history. In , Gillquist and his colleagues in Chicago established a network of house churches throughout the United States, aiming to restore a primitive form of Christianity, which was called the New Covenant Apostolic Order. Researching the historical basis of the Christian faith, Gillquist and his colleagues found sources for this restoration in the writings of the early Church Fathers. This led the group to practice a more liturgical form of worship than in their previous evangelical background. Originally known as the Christian World Liberation Front, and then the New Covenant Apostolic Order, in  the Evangelical Orthodox Church (EOC) was organized.

A desire for apostolic succession led most members of the EOC to join the Antiochian Orthodox Christian Archdiocese of North America in  after first investigating the Episcopal Church, the Roman Catholic Church, the Greek Orthodox Archdiocese of America, and the Orthodox Church in America (OCA). Gillquist and other EOC leaders traveled to Istanbul to meet with Patriarch Demetrios I of Constantinople but were unable to complete any substantial progress toward their goal. However, they were able to meet with Patriarch Ignatius IV of Antioch during his historic visit to Los Angeles that year. This group became known as the Antiochian Evangelical Orthodox Mission, lasting until  when its parishes were absorbed into the standard diocesan framework of the archdiocese.

On , he retired as the head of the Archdiocese Department of Missions and Evangelism.

Death
After services in Bloomington and Carmel, Indiana, he was buried at the cemetery at Bloomington's All Saints' Orthodox Church, where his son, the Rev. Fr. Peter Jon Gillquist, serves as the priest.

Selected works

References

1938 births
2012 deaths
20th-century American clergy
20th-century Eastern Orthodox priests
21st-century American clergy
21st-century Eastern Orthodox priests
American Eastern Orthodox priests
American people of Swedish descent
Clergy from Minneapolis
Converts to Eastern Orthodoxy from Protestantism
Eastern Orthodox priests in the United States
Members of the Greek Orthodox Church of Antioch
People from Bloomington, Indiana
People from Santa Barbara, California
University of Minnesota School of Journalism and Mass Communication alumni
Wheaton College (Illinois) alumni
Writers from California
Writers from Indiana
Writers from Minneapolis